Szilárd Mitra (born 9 January 1987) is a Romanian professional footballer of Hungarian ethnicity, who plays as a midfielder for AFC Odorheiu Secuiesc.

Honours
Csíkszereda
Liga III: 2018–19

Odorheiu Secuiesc
Liga III: 2021–22

References

External links
 
 

1987 births
Living people
People from Sfântu Gheorghe
Romanian sportspeople of Hungarian descent
Romanian footballers
Association football midfielders
Liga I players
Liga II players
FC Argeș Pitești players
Sepsi OSK Sfântu Gheorghe players
FK Csíkszereda Miercurea Ciuc players